Anapisa tristigma is a moth of the family Erebidae. It was described by Paul Mabille in 1893. It is found in Sierra Leone.

References

Moths described in 1893
Syntomini
Erebid moths of Africa